The St Stephen's Chapel is a historic Anglican church in Judges Bay, Parnell, Auckland.

History

Designed by Frederick Thatcher, the chapel replaced an earlier one that had been built in 1844 by Sampson Kempthorne, which had collapsed in July 1845. Thatcher's chapel was opened in early 1857. The chapel is unique in that it was almost certainly built specifically as the place of signing of the constitution of the United Church of England and Ireland in New Zealand, and its floor plan is a Greek Cross as a symbol of the establishment of the church, whilst all other churches built for Bishop Selwyn use the traditional Latin cruciform plan.

The chapel fell into disrepair, and was restores in the late 1920s.

The chapel and its churchyard were registered on 1 September 1983 by the New Zealand Historic Places Trust (now Heritage New Zealand) as a Category I historic place with registration number 22.

Notable burials
 Charles Baker (1803 - 1875), missionary
 Josiah Firth (1826–1897), businessman and politician
 James Kemp (1797–1872), missionary
Frederick Whitaker (1812 – 1891), premier of New Zealand (twice)
 Reader Wood (1821–1895), politician and architect

References

Heritage New Zealand Category 1 historic places in the Auckland Region
1857 establishments in New Zealand
Stephen's Chapel
Churches completed in 1857
1850s architecture in New Zealand
Frederick Thatcher church buildings
Parnell, New Zealand